Calvin Comins Bliss (December 22, 1823 in Calais, Vermont – December 13, 1891) was the first Lieutenant Governor of Arkansas, serving from 1864 to 1868.

References

1823 births
1891 deaths
People from Calais, Vermont
Lieutenant Governors of Arkansas
19th-century American politicians